Polyvalente W.-A. Losier is a francophone high school located in Tracadie-Sheila, New Brunswick, Canada.

External links
 WA Losier School Site

High schools in New Brunswick
Education in Gloucester County, New Brunswick